The 2011 Davis Cup World Group Play-offs were held from September 16 to 18. They were the main play-offs of 2011 Davis Cup. Winners of the playoffs advanced to the 2012 World Group, and losers were relegated to their respective Zonal Regions I.

Teams
Bold indicates team has qualified for the 2012 Davis Cup World Group.

 From World Group

 From Americas Group I

 From Asia/Oceania Group I

 From Europe/Africa Group I

Results

Seeded teams
 
 
 
 
 
 
 
 

Unseeded teams

 
 
 
 
 
  
 
 

Playoff results

Romania vs. Czech Republic

Russia vs. Brazil

Israel vs. Canada

South Africa vs. Croatia

Chile vs. Italy

Japan vs. India

Belgium vs. Austria

Australia vs. Switzerland

References

World Group Play-offs